István Szőke (13 February 1947 – 1 June 2022) was a Hungarian footballer who played as a midfielder for Ferencvárosi TC.

He participated in UEFA Euro 1972 for the Hungary national team.

References

 Ki kicsoda a magyar sportéletben? [Who's Who in the Hungarian Sport Life], Volume III (S–Z). Babits Kiadó, Szekszárd: 1995, p. 172, 
 Rejtő László–Lukács László–Szepesi György: Felejthetetlen 90 percek [Unforgettable 90 Minutes] (Sportkiadó, 1977) 

1947 births
2022 deaths
Hungarian footballers
Association football midfielders
Hungary international footballers
UEFA Euro 1972 players
Ferencvárosi TC footballers
Footballers from Budapest
Volán FC players